St. Francis of Assisi, Halstead is a Catholic parish church in Halstead, Suffolk.

History  
Acorrding to the Deanery overseeing Halstead:
In 1897, Cardinal Vaughan visited Halstead to deliver lectures about the Catholic Faith and due to his visit, Mass was declared to be celebrated once a month in a room in the street of Rosemary Lane.
In 1928, a temporary church was set up (which now serves at the Church Hall),
In 1955, after 58 years of not having a church (since Cardinal Vaughan visited and Mass began to be celebrated in Halstead), the St. Francis of Assisi Church, Halstead was opened.

References 

Catholic Church in England